The Ministry of Planning & National Development of the Republic of Somaliland (MoPND)  is a cabinet ministry of the Government of Somaliland. The ministry is responsible for financial and public policy development institution of its Government. The ministry undertakes research studies and state policy development initiatives for the growth of national economy and the expansion of the public and state infrastructure of the country. The current minister is Ahmed Aden Ahmed Buuhane.

See also 
 Politics of Somaliland

References

External links 
 Official Website of the Government of Somaliland

Politics of Somaliland
Government ministries of Somaliland